Alfred Albini (15 July 1896 – 4 November 1978) was a Croatian-Jewish architect. He received a Vladimir Nazor Award for architecture and urban planning.

Albini was born and died in Zagreb. He worked at the ateliers of Viktor Kovačić and Hugo Ehrlich and as a professor at the Faculty of Architecture at the University of Zagreb. He projected single-family houses and apartment buildings, together with civic buildings (Faculty of Technology at the University of Zagreb). He synthesized modernistic ideas into his own architectural expression. He discussed the problem of urban planning and the protection of landmarks, wrote expert works and theoretical articles and painted. Albini died on 4 November 1978 in Zagreb. He was buried at the Mirogoj Cemetery.

See also
 List of Croatian architects

Citations

Bibliography

External links
 
 Biography

1896 births
1978 deaths
Austro-Hungarian Jews
Burials at Mirogoj Cemetery
Architects from Zagreb
Croatian Austro-Hungarians
Croatian Jews
Yugoslav architects
Faculty of Architecture, University of Zagreb alumni
Jewish architects
Academic staff of the University of Zagreb
Vladimir Nazor Award winners